= Glisezinski Lake =

Lake in the state of Wisconsin, United States

- Gleabiski Lake; Glesbiki Lake; Lake Glesbiski
- Location within Wisconsin Location within the United States
- Location: Portage County, Wisconsin
- Coordinates: 44°40′25″N 89°25′26″W
- Type: lake
- Etymology: Glisezinski family
- Basin countries: United States
- Surface area: 35 acres (14 ha)
- Max. depth: 11 ft (3.4 m)
- Surface elevation: 1,175 ft (358 m)

Glisezinski Lake is a lake in the U.S. state of Wisconsin.

The lake was named after the local Glisezinski family. Variant names are "Gleabiski Lake", "Glesbiki Lake", and "Lake Glesbiski". Glisezinski Lake is a 35 acres (14 ha) lake located in Portage County. It has a maximum depth of 11 feet (3.4 m).
